Knall and Fall as Imposters (German: Knall und Fall als Hochstapler) is a 1952 Austrian-German comedy film directed by Ulrich Bettac and Hubert Marischka and starring Hans Richter, Rudolf Carl and Curd Jürgens. It was followed by a 1953 sequel Knall and Fall as Detectives.

It was shot at the Sievering Studios in Vienna and on location across the city. The film's sets were designed by Fritz Jüptner-Jonstorff.

Plot
Two rural men are picked at random for parts in a film production in which they are to play a millionaire and his chauffeur. After an accident while shooting a scene, the car they are in runs out of control and ends up crashing into a sanatorium. The director, believing that a real millionaire has arrived at the financially struggling establishment, puts them up. They are forced for a while to live as imposters until matters are eventually resolved.

Cast
Hans Richter as Knall 
Rudolf Carl as Fall  
Curd Jürgens as John Vandergold  
Friedl Czepa as Direktorium des Sanatoriums  
Waltraut Haas as Bettina Brandtner  
Ilka Windish as Irene Dahlen  
Ulrich Bettac as Regisseur  
Viktor Braun 
Heinz Conrads as Scheich  
Peter Gerhard 
Fritz Imhoff as Portier  
Franz Marischka as Aufnahmeleiter  
Hans Olden as Bankvorsteher  
Peter W. Staub as Studienrat Hegetschweiler  
Hermann Laforet as Produzent  
Ady Berber as Bademeister  
Johannes Roth as Sambu, Diener

References

External links

1952 comedy films
Austrian comedy films
German comedy films
West German films
Films directed by Hubert Marischka
Films scored by Hans Lang
Buddy comedy films
Films shot in Vienna
Films shot at Sievering Studios
Austrian black-and-white films
German black-and-white films
1950s German films